MechWarrior 3050, also known as BattleTech in its original Sega Genesis release and in Japan as BattleTech 3050 (バトルテック3050), is a 1994 mech-based video game developed by Malibu. The first BattleTech based game to be released for the Sega Genesis, it was later ported to the Super Nintendo by Activision as MechWarrior 3050. The Super Nintendo game was localized and published in Japan by Ask Group.

The story takes place during the events of the Clan Invasion in the 3050 era. Players are assigned the role of a Clan Wolf Mechwarrior, who is sent to eliminate several Inner Sphere assets which threaten to destroy the Clan's dominance on the battlefield, and given Timber Wolf/MadCat mech.

This video game is viewed in an isometric view as opposed to the first person view of the previous game. The game also features a two-player mode where one player controls the bottom half of the mech to navigate it around the map while the second player controls the gun turret.

Reception
Though the four reviewers of Electronic Gaming Monthly complained that the game's single-player mode is difficult to the point of being inaccessible, all but one of them gave the Genesis version a positive recommendation, citing the diversity of missions, strong challenge, and impressive animations. They scored it a 7.25 out of 10 average. They were evenly split on the Super NES version, with two of them recommending it based on the diversity of levels, and the other two focusing on the frustratingly difficult single player mode and the confusing controls. They scored it a 6.75 out of 10 average. A critic for Next Generation gave it three out of five stars, assessing that, compared to the Genesis original, it has sharper graphics but clunkier animation and worse control. He praised the game itself for its frantic, challenging onslaught of enemies. GamePros Scary Larry was uneasy at how the two-player mode demands that the two players be in perfect sync with each other, and said that the failure to do so could lead to bitter arguments. He also criticized the undetailed graphics, choppy animation, and limited sound effects, but recommended the game for its challenging, strategic, and overall fun gameplay.

References

External links
Battletech at MobyGames
MechWarrior 3050 at GameFAQs (Super NES version)
Battletech at GameFAQs (Sega Genesis version)
Battletech at The Ultimate SEGA Retro Database

1994 video games
Activision games
BattleTech games
Malibu Interactive games
MechWarrior
Sega Genesis games
Super Nintendo Entertainment System games
Video games scored by Brian L. Schmidt
Video games set in the 31st century
Video games set on fictional planets
Video games developed in the United States